Music Theater Works (formerly Light Opera Works) is a resident professional not-for-profit musical theatre company in Evanston, Illinois. It was founded in 1980 by Philip Kraus, Bridget McDonough, and Ellen Dubinsky.

Music Theater Works has presented over 75 productions of operetta and musical theatre at Northwestern University's 1,000-seat Cahn Auditorium. Since 1998, in addition to its three annual productions in this theatre, Music Theater Works also produces a fourth, more intimate show, in the 450 seat Nichols Concert Hall. The company performs all of its productions in English with orchestra.

History
Kraus was the first Artistic Director of the company, serving from 1981 through 1999. The first production of the company occurred in 1981 with a staging of Gilbert and Sullivan's H.M.S. Pinafore. Under Kraus' leadership, the company's main emphasis in programming centered on American, French and Viennese operetta, and Gilbert and Sullivan's Savoy operas.

Lara Teeter succeeded Kraus and served as Artistic Director until 2004. He continued to program operettas but added more musical theatre pieces from later in the 20th century. Rudy Hogenmiller took over in 2005 and continued that trend. In 2017, the company changed its name from Light Opera Works to Music Theater Works. In 2019, Hogenmiller and founding General Manager Bridget McDonough retired, to be replaced by Kyle Dougan as Producing Artistic Director.

Repertory
In its early years, the company staged all twelve of the full-length extant Gilbert and Sullivan operas, including an Elizabethan concept Mikado (1986) and an Edward Gorey/Tim Burton-inspired Ruddigore (1996), as well as the less frequently produced Utopia Limited (1984) and The Grand Duke (1992).

The company has produced a number of Chicago premieres, including Emmerich Kálmán's The Duchess of Chicago (1998), Jerome Moross' The Golden Apple (1995), and Karl Millöcker's The Beggar Student, as well as revivals such as Oscar Straus' The Chocolate Soldier (1987) and A Waltz Dream (1992) (both with translations by Kraus and lyricist Gregory Opelka), Victor Herbert's Babes in Toyland (1994) and The Red Mill (1992), and Leonard Bernstein's Wonderful Town (1996).  The company embarked on a Kurt Weill cycle in 1989 beginning with Lady in the Dark (1990), and including One Touch of Venus (1997) and Knickerbocker Holiday (1993).

In 1998, in addition to its three annual shows in the Cahn Auditorium, Light Opera Works also began to produce a fourth, more intimate show each year in the 250-seat Second Stage or at Nichols Concert Hall.  These have included classic operettas like Jacques Offenbach's The Isle of Tulipitan, new works such as Soup du Jour and No Way to Treat a Lady, revues like Side by Side by Sondheim, and revivals such as Darling of the Day.

List of productions
2010: The Yeoman of the Guard; Carousel; I Do! I Do!; Hello Dolly
2009: A Little Night Music My Fair Lady; C'est la vie (Second Stage); The Pirates of Penzance
2008: Gigi; Iolanthe; Side by Side by Sondheim (Second Stage); The Music Man
2007: Kiss Me, Kate; Bitter Sweet; Berlin to Broadway with Kurt Weill (Second Stage); Oklahoma! 
2006: South Pacific; 110 in the Shade; Ben Bagley's The Decline and Fall of the Entire World as Seen Through the Eyes of Cole Porter (Second Stage); The Mikado 
2005: Carnival!; The Merry Widow; Darling of the Day (Second Stage); The Sound of Music 
2004: Sweethearts; Candide; No Way to Treat a Lady - Douglas J. Cohen (Second Stage); H.M.S. Pinafore 
2003: Ragtime; Fiddler on the Roof; My Night at Jacques - Jacques Offenbach (Second Stage); Die Fledermaus 
2002: Gypsy Love - Franz Lehár; Camelot; Soup du Jour - Opelka, Mueller and Boland (Second Stage); The Pirates of Penzance 
2001: Countess Maritza; Kismet; You Never Know (Second Stage); The Student Prince  
2000: The Gondoliers; Man of La Mancha; Tintypes (Second Stage); The Great Waltz  
1999: Beautiful Helen of Troy (La Belle Hélène); Rose-Marie; She Loves Me (Second Stage); The Mikado 
1998: The Yeomen of the Guard; The Duchess of Chicago; The Fantasticks (Second Stage); The Desert Song
1997: H.M.S. Pinafore; One Touch of Venus; The Merry Widow 
1996: The Chocolate Soldier; Ruddigore; Wonderful Town  
1995: The Pirates of Penzance; The Golden Apple; Die Fledermaus 
1994: A Night in Venice; The Student Prince; The Most Happy Fella 
1993: The Count of Luxembourg; Iolanthe; Babes in Toyland 
1992: A Waltz Dream; The Grand Duke; Knickerbocker Holiday 
1991: Bitter Sweet; The Beggar Student; The Red Mill 
1990: The Gypsy Princess; Princess Ida; The New Moon 
1989: Vienna Life (Wiener Blut); Patience; Lady in the Dark 
1988: The Land of Smiles; La Périchole; The Desert Song
1987: The Sorcerer; The Chocolate Soldier; Rose-Marie 
1986: The Mikado; The Grand Duchess of Gerolstein; Die Fledermaus 
1985: The Gondoliers; The Gypsy Baron; The Student Prince 
1984: La Vie parisienne; The Merry Widow; Utopia, Limited 
1983: The Pirates of Penzance; A Little Night Music; Naughty Marietta 
1982: The Beautiful Galatea (Die schöne Galathee); Gianni Schicchi; Candide 
1981: H.M.S. Pinafore; Orpheus in the Underworld

Other activities
Music Theater Works is a member of the League of Chicago Theatres and a founding member of Chicago Performances. The company has collaborated on artistic and educational projects with the Union League Club, Boys and Girls Club, Evanston District 65 schools, Theatre Building Chicago, and other organizations.

Notes

References
Von Rhein, John.  "Lighten up, critics" Chicago Tribune 1990, 10th Anniversary article
Whitmore, Julie.  "Light opera company brings Europe to Evanston" in Crain's Chicago Business, June 20, 1988, p. 27

External links
Official website
History of the company 1980–1999

Musical groups established in 1980
Theatre companies in Evanston, Illinois
Gilbert and Sullivan performing groups
Opera companies in Chicago
1980 establishments in Illinois
Northwestern University